Hong He or Honghe (Chinese: t , s , p Hóng Hé, lit. "Red River") typically refers to the Red River of southern China and northern Vietnam.

It may also refer to:
 Red River, a 2008 Chinese film
Honghe Hani and Yi Autonomous Prefecture (Hónghé Hānízú–Yízú Zìzhìzhōu; Hani: Haoqhoqxeif) in Yunnan, China

Other places in China 
Honghe County (Hónghéxiàn) within the Honghe Hani & Yi Autonomous Prefecture
 Honghe (Hónghézhèn), a town in Changle County, Shandong
 Honghe a township in Li County, Gansu
Honghe, a township in Jingchuan County, Gansu

Other places in China romanized as Honghe or Hong He include:
 Honghe (Hónghéxiàn), a town in Jiaxing's Xiuzhou District in Zhejiang, China

See also
Hongshui River
 Song Hong (disambiguation) for the Vietnamese form of the same name

zh:红河 (消歧义)